Sculpture Australia '69 is a 1969 Australian TV documentary directed by Tim Burstall.

References

External links
Complete copy of film at National Film and Sound Archive YouTube Channel
Sculpture Australia '69 at IMDb

Australian television shows
Documentary films about the visual arts
Films directed by Tim Burstall